Robert Joseph Congel (July 6, 1935February 3, 2021) was an American real estate developer known for his foundation of Pyramid Companies and development of projects such as Destiny USA.

References 

1935 births
2021 deaths
American real estate businesspeople